Sanjeev (born 28 September 1975) is an Indian film and television actor. He is most known for his role as Selvam in the Tamil drama serial on Sun TV titled Thirumathi Selvam (2007-2013) in which he starred opposite Abitha. The serial telecasted for almost 6 years with Sanjeev gaining huge recognition and appreciation. He has acted in many other serials, notably Metti Oli, Anandham, Annamalai, Aval, Yaaradi Nee Mohini and Kanmani; he has played the role of both protagonist and antagonists spanning a career for over 17 years.

Personal life 
Sanjeev is a close friend of Tamil actor Vijay.  Both of them studied visual communications at Loyola College. He is the nephew of late actress Manjula Vijayakumar. Sanjeev married leading television actress Preethi Srinivasan in 2009. His only sister Sindhu has done few films as a heroine and later acted in many successful serials like Metti Oli, Penn, Anandham and so on. His sister Sindhu died in 2005 and Sanjeev took full responsibility for his sister's daughter (who was only 9 years old at the time of her mother's death). Sanjeev and his wife Preethi had conducted her wedding in 2017, as her parents. His close friends in the television industry are Deepak Dinkar and Shreekumar and Vijay. Sanjeev has two children: Laya, who was born in May 2010, and Adhav, who was born in April 2014.

Career 
Sanjeev started his career doing supporting roles playing Vijay's friend in most of the movies. He entered the television industry with the serial Metti Oli in which he played a negative role in 2002. After doing a number of negative and supporting characters, he got his break with Thirumathi Selvam (2007-2013) in which he played the main lead for the first time. The serial led to his popularity among the Tamil audience, and his performance in the show was well appreciated and received. Sanjeev is known to Tamil families as Selvam, the character he portrayed in the serial. Awards he received for this include a Tamil Nadu State Award for Best Television Actor in 2008 and Sun Kudumbam Award for Best Actor 2010.

Filmography

Television soaps

Films
All films are in Tamil, unless otherwise noted.

Reality shows/live shows

Dubbing artist

Awards and honours

References 

Living people
Tamil male actors
Tamil theatre
Tamil male television actors
Tamil television presenters
Television personalities from Tamil Nadu
Male actors from Tamil Nadu
Male actors in Tamil cinema
21st-century Tamil male actors
Tamil Reality dancing competition contestants
1975 births
Bigg Boss (Tamil TV series) contestants